Cesare Rossarol was a scout cruiser built in Sestri Ponente, Genoa, in 1913 and launched by S.A.I. Gio. Ansaldo & C. in Liguria, Italy, in 1914. Like her sister ships, Alessandro Poerio and Guglielmo Pepe, she was named after a famous Neapolitan light cavalryman who helped defend Venice from attacks by the Austro-Hungarian Army during the revolutions in 1848.

Service
She could launch torpedoes while maintaining a constant speed of over 30 knots. With a displacement of 891 tons or 1,270 tons when full, she was fitted with six 102/35 mm, four tls. trainings 45 mm and two 40/39 machine-guns with a mine positioning system, making her the equivalent of the Austro-Hungarian -class light cruisers.

She began service in November 1915, patrolling the lower part of the Adriatic, and later joining her sister ships to form the Second Group of the Fourth Division. Together they patrolled the upper Adriatic until June 1917 when she was ordered to be transferred to Brindisi and incorporated into the Fourth Group of the Fourth Division. She took part in several battle operations, laying mine fields, fighting small ships and aircraft, scouting and escorting battleships.

Sinking
During the Adriatic Campaign of World War I, soldiers of the Austro-Hungarian Empire set up extensive minefields along the waters of the Istrian Peninsula. Following the Armistice of 4 November 1918, no real attempt to communicate the position or extent of the many minefields was made and, as a result of this lack of action on the part of the Austro-Hungarian Empire's naval command, a number of ships were sunk after the war after hitting wartime mines. Cesare Rossarol was sunk by a mine less than one week after the ceasefire declared by Germany on Armistice Day.

At the end of the war Cesare Rossarol was off the coast of Austria-Hungary, outside the empire's main naval harbour and arsenal at Pola. She had been assigned to serve as an anti-submarine patrol ship after giving support to the landing and occupation of the city when Lieutenant Ludovico De Filippi, captain of Cesare Rossarol, received orders to escort a Serbian officer to Fiume whose orders were to convince the Serb-Croatian irregular troops not to oppose to the Italian occupation of the city. Just before noon, she moved down from Pola to Cape Kamenjak and then on towards Fiume Harbour only to hit a mine early on Saturday afternoon 16 November 1918.

The force of the explosion almost instantly tore the ship in two parts. The bow quickly sank vertically, while the severely damaged 30-meter high stern drifted for another hundred meters before sinking. Eighteen other ships arrived at the site, but most of the crew were trapped inside the hull and went down with the ship.

The sinking of Cesare Rossarol two nautical miles off the coast of Lisignano left ninety-three petty officers and marines dead, including seven officers and the captain and was one of the largest losses of life for the Italian navy during the war.

Notes

Citations

External links
 Wreck "Cesare Rossarol" on YouTube
 Cesare Rossarol Marina Militare website

1914 ships
World War I shipwrecks in the Adriatic Sea
World War I cruisers of Italy
Ships built in Genoa
Ships built by Gio. Ansaldo & C.
Cruisers of the Regia Marina
Maritime incidents in 1918
Ships sunk by mines